The Reconnaissance & Surveillance Squadron is a specialized unit within the US Army's Battlefield Surveillance Brigade (BfSB) that blends ground Cavalry troops with an elite Long Range Surveillance (LRS) Airborne Infantry Company continuing the US Army's march toward a modular force.

The Reconnaissance & Surveillance Squadron (R&S Squadron) consists of a Headquarters Troop, (Company C) Long Range Surveillance (LRS) unit (Airborne Infantry Company) for strategic level Long Range Reconnaissance and Surveillance missions (the backbone of the R&S units and the BfSB), two ground (Troops A and B) Cavalry Troops for basic tactical Reconnaissance taskings and the Reconnaissance & Surveillance Squadron (R&S Squadron) mounted Quick Reaction Force (QRF) and Ready Reaction Force (RRF) Security Force (SECFOR), dismounted Quick Reaction Force (QRF) and Ready Reaction Force (RRF) Security Force (SECFOR) and one line Infantry Company responsible for the Reconnaissance & Surveillance Squadron (R&S Squadron) Base Security Force (SECFOR).

History

Lieutenant Colonel James Gaylord and Command Sergeant Major Eric Dostie present the company guidon at the 38th Cavalry Regiment's activation ceremony Thursday.  Fort Bragg's newest unit unfurled its flag Thursday.  The activation of the 1st Squadron of the 38th Cavalry Regiment added about 300 Soldiers to Fort Bragg.  They included Staff Sergeant Roch Schenk, who sat on horseback in an Army uniform from the Indian wars of the late 1800s on the parade field.  Squadron officers wore black Stetson hats at the ceremony in honor of their horse cavalry heritage.  Each troop stood in formation with its red-and-white cavalry guidon.  "Based on lessons learned from combat operations in Iraq and Afghanistan, the Army leaders saw a need for a very special unit", Colonel Joe Cox said.  Cox is commander of the 525th Battlefield Surveillance Brigade, the host for the ceremony and the squadron's parent organization.  The parade field is in the brigade area at Jackson and Letterman streets.  The squadron is designed to conduct Reconnaissance and Surveillance operations for divisions, corps and joint task forces, Cox said.  The commanders of those large units have a "near-insatiable appetite for persistent Surveillance during the day and night, in all weather conditions", he said.  "Army architects developed a blueprint for a multifunctional organization that blends ground cavalry troops with a Long Range Surveillance company, which is Airborne", Cox said.  The Long Range Surveillance company's Soldiers stood in the formation wearing the elite Maroon Beret of Airborne Soldiers.  Other Soldiers wore the Army's standard black beret.  The newly activated unit is the Army's first Reconnaissance & Surveillance Squadron (R&S Squadron) within the newly formed Battlefield Surveillance Brigade (BfSB)s, Cox said.  "Scouts, Snipers, Paratroopers, artillerymen, tactical air controllers, combat medics, coupled with communications and intelligence personnel, can just about accomplish any mission", Cox said.  The squadron soon will add unmanned aerial vehicles, Cox said.  The commander is Lieutenant Colonel Jim Gaylord, who graduated from West Point in 1992 and was commissioned as an armor officer.  Earlier this month, he made his first parachute jump in more than 17 years, Cox said.  "So he is no longer referred to as the item attached to the back of a chicken, that being a dirty, nasty leg", Cox said. "Leg" is a disparaging term used by some Paratroopers for non-airborne personnel.  "Although we are activating a new unit, we have a wealth of experience in the ranks", Gaylord said.  Of the squadron's Soldiers, 128 have been deployed and served a combined 1,560 months in combat zones, he said.  Four have Purple Hearts for combat wounds, and four have valor awards.  "I'd also like to point out we have at least one cavalryman who can ride a horse", Gaylord said.  Command Sgt. Maj. Eric Dostie, who was trained as a cavalry scout, is the senior noncommissioned officer.  He was a Sheridan tank gunner in the 194th Separate Armored Brigade at Fort Knox, Ky.  The 282nd Army Band from Fort Jackson, SC, played "Gary Owen", a traditional cavalry tune, as the Soldiers marched off the parade field.

Transformation
Former units consisted of one active component and two inactive detachments, there are now both Active-duty and National Guard Surveillance Brigades, each having a specific Table of Organization and Equipment.

The changes made were all part of an Army-wide transition to the Army Modular Force, future-concept ("Grow The Army Plan" of modernization) proposed by US Army Chief of Staff General Peter Schoomaker in 2007. The plan calls for ten Surveillance Brigades, three of which are active units: the 504th BfSB at Fort Hood, Texas; the 525th BfSB at Fort Bragg, North Carolina, and the 201st BfSB at Fort Lewis, Washington. The planned fourth active BfSB to have been stationed at Ft. Polk, Louisiana, had its activation cancelled.  The remaining seven BfSB's are designated to the Army National Guard: the 58th BfSB from Maryland, the 67th BFSB from Nebraska, the 71st BfSB from Texas, the 142nd BfSB from Alabama, the 219th BfSB from Indiana, the 297th BfSB from Alaska, and the 560th BfSB from Georgia, all of which are moving to the objective designs by the scheduled completion of the Grow The Army Plan by fiscal year 2013.

Contrast with Reconnaissance, Surveillance, and Target Acquisition (RSTA) units

The BfSB's R&S Squadron and specifically its elite LRS unit (Airborne Infantry "Recon" Company) are not to be confused with the new Army concept of elite Reconnaissance, Surveillance, and Target Acquisition (RSTA) units (a non-Airborne capable Cavalry basic tactical Reconnaissance unit).  RSTA units are a part of the Army-wide transfer to Brigade Combat Teams, all combat divisions and separate brigades are transitioning to the RSTA format, The Reconnaissance & Surveillance Squadron is a specialized unit within the US Army's new Battlefield Surveillance Brigade (BfSB) that blends ground Cavalry troops with an Elite Long Range Surveillance (LRS) Airborne Infantry Company for the purpose of executing strategic level Long Range Surveillance missions deep within enemy lines.

RSTA units are not Airborne capable, whereas all LRS units are (exceptions being the RSTA squadron of the 4th BCT (Airborne), 25th Infantry Division; the 173rd Airborne BCT; and the four in the 82nd Airborne Division).

By doctrine, RSTA units do not require their leadership positions to be filled by Ranger qualified officers and NCOs as LRSU units do in addition to many more specialized skill qualifications through extensive training.

Training

LRSUs are Airborne Forces and most leadership positions are filled by Ranger qualified officers and NCOs.  LRS leaders typically undergo the Reconnaissance and Surveillance Leaders Course (RSLC) at Fort Benning, where they learn long-range land navigation, communications, intelligence, vehicle identification, survival, and operational techniques.

LRS troopers are often graduates of other specialized schools including: the U.S. Army Sniper School, Special Operations Target Interdiction Course (SOITC), US Army Ranger School, Waterborne Infiltration Course (WIC), Special Forces Combat Diver Qualification Course, HALO, Reconnaissance Surveillance Leaders Course RSLC (Formerly designated as the Long Range Surveillance Leaders Course (LRSLC)), Pathfinder, Air Assault School, Jumpmaster, Survival, Evasion, Resistance and Escape (SERE).  Long Range Surveillance Combat Medics, similar to the 75th Ranger Regiment are required to graduate the Special Operations Medicine Course and many US Army LRS Troopers attend the International Special Training Center (ISTC)'s, the ISTC trains NATO Special Operations Forces, and similar type units, in advanced individual Patrolling, Battlefield Medicine, Close Quarter Battle, Sniper, Survival, Planning, and Recognition Skills.  It was established in 1979, and first called the International Long Range Reconnaissance Patrol School (ILRRPS) formerly located in Weingarten, Germany and later move to Pfullendorf, Germany.

US Army LRS-Us conduct training exercises and exchange programs with various US allies. In recent years these exercises have included deployments to England, Germany, France, Hungary, and Italy.  Joint training exercises have involved units from British TA SAS, France's 13 RDP, Belgium's ESR, Italy's 9 Para Assault Regiment, and Germany's Fernspählehrkompanie 200 Long Range Scout Companies or FSLK200 (roughly translated: Surveillance and Reconnaissance Instruction Company 200).

See also
 The Battlefield Surveillance Brigade (BfSB)
 The US Army's Long Range Surveillance (LRS)

References

External links

 Army Times "Army stands up recon, surveillance squadron" Staff report | Saturday 23 May 20099:15:15 EDT
 US Army Field Manual 7-93 Long Range Surveillance Unit Operations. (FM 7-93)
 PDF downloadable version of the US Army’s Long Range Surveillance Unit Operations Field Manual. (FM 7-93) This manual provides doctrine, tactics, techniques, and procedures on how Long Range Surveillance Units perform combat operationas a part of the Army's new Battlefield Surveillance Brigades.
 LRSU: EYES OF THE COMMANDER by Staff Sergeants Brent W. Dick and Kevin M. Lydon
 [ "Riding With the Posse Part I" By Mike Gifford]
 International Special Training Center and NATO celebrate 30 years of teaching special forces. (July 2, 2009) By: Maj. Jennifer Johnson, 7th Army Joint Multinational Training Command Public Affairs

Battlefield surveillance units and formations of the United States Army
Reconnaissance squadrons of the United States Army